Hubei is a town in Jiaocheng District, Ningde, Fujian province, China. , it has 18 villages under its administration: 
Chalu Village
Dongyuan Village
Fushan Village
Huangbai Village
Huangjia Village
Jiucuo Village
Meihe Village
Nanling Village
Qidian Village
Shangpu Village
Wenfeng Village
Xialou Village
Xiayang Village
Xinting Village
Xincuo Village
Yanbing Village
Zhongyangli Village
Jiadi Village

See also 
 List of township-level divisions of Fujian

References 

Township-level divisions of Fujian
Ningde